Benet or Benét refers to:

People
BeBe Zahara Benet (born 1980), Cameroonian-American drag queen
Brenda Benet (1945–1982), American actress
Christie Benet (1879–1951), American politician from South Carolina
Eric Benét (born 1966), American R&B and gospel singer
Juan Benet (1927–1993), Spanish writer
Leslie Z. Benet (born 1937), American pharmaceutical scientist
Mordecai Benet (1753–1829) a Talmudist and chief rabbi of Moravia
Robert Benet, 16th century English Protestant 
Stephen Vincent Benét (1898–1943), American writer
Stephen Vincent Benet (soldier) (1827–1895), career officer in the U.S. Army 
Sula Benet (1903–1982), Polish anthropologist
Thomas Bennet (academic), or Thomas Benet, 17th century Oxford academic
Thomas Benet (martyr) (died 1531), English Protestant martyr
William Rose Benét (1886–1950), American writer

Other
 Benet, Vendée, a place in France
 Benet Academy, in Lisle, Illinois, U.S.
 Benét Laboratories, U.S. Army technology center
 Benet's Reader's Encyclopedia, a 1948 reference work
 Benet, a trade name for the anti-osteoporosis drug Risedronic acid

See also

Bennet (disambiguation)
Bennett (disambiguation)
Benett, a surname
St Benet (disambiguation)